HMS Modeste was a British Royal Navy corvette commissioned in 1838 and sold in 1866.

Operations

The Modeste was a part of the British forces engaged in the First Opium War against the Qing Empire.

References
Lyon, David and Rif Winfield. The Sail and Steam Navy List: All of the Ships of the Royal Navy, 1815-1889. London: Chatham Publishing. 2004, p. 120.

External links
Picture of model at National Maritime Museum Greenwich

Corvettes of the Royal Navy
First Opium War ships of the United Kingdom